Fort McMurray Water Aerodrome  is located adjacent to Fort McMurray, Alberta, Canada.

See also
List of airports in the Fort McMurray area

References

Registered aerodromes in Fort McMurray
Seaplane bases in Fort McMurray